Gulbahar or Gul Bahar is one of the neighborhoods of Liaquatabad Town in Karachi, Sindh, Pakistan.

Gulbahar Colony, which was known as Golimar, is a suburb of Karachi. This area is along the Lyari River and was mainly farmland before the settlement of Muslim refugees after the independence of Pakistan. There are several ethnic groups in Gulbahar including Urdu speakers, Sindhis, Kashmiris, Seraikis, Pakhtuns,  Punjabis, Balochs, Memons. Ismaili Shia Muslims are present in large number in Gulbahar.

Neighborhoods 
There are following areas in Gulbahar.

Ismailis 
Ismailis are present in large number in Gulbahar. Their main centres are located between Gulbahar Police Station and Lyari River.

Sultanabad Colony 
Sultanabad Colony  no. 2 is popularly known as Sultanabad Colony, it has an Ismaili Jama'at Khana and Ismaili Religious Education Centre.

See also 
 Golimar
 Jama'at Khana
 Sultanabad Colony
 Sultanabad Housing Society

External links 
 Liaquatabad Town.

Neighbourhoods of Karachi
Liaquatabad Town
Ismailism in Pakistan